Kerry Williams (born 21 March 1986) is an English field hockey player.

References 

Living people
English female field hockey players
Place of birth missing (living people)
Commonwealth Games medallists in field hockey
Commonwealth Games bronze medallists for England
Loughborough Students field hockey players
Field hockey players at the 2010 Commonwealth Games
1986 births
Medallists at the 2010 Commonwealth Games